State Highway 77 (SH 77)  is a numbered state highway in Texas, occupying the counties of Morris and Cass.

Route description
In Douglassville, SH 77 intersects SH 8. After cutting across the south side of Atlanta, where it meets US 59 (Future Interstate 369), SH 77 cuts to the southeast, and crosses into the very northwest corner of Louisiana near Three Corners (where Arkansas, Louisiana and Texas meet), becoming Louisiana Highway 1.

History
SH 77 was originally proposed on August 21, 1923, as a route from Douglasville to Naples, replacing SH 1B. On June 24, 1931, SH 77 was extended southeast to Louisiana, replacing a portion of SH 47. On August 4, 1932, SH 77 was extended to SH 11 (now US 259). On March 11, 1935, SH 77 Spur was designated to Marietta. This would be cancelled on completion, but would be restored on April 19, 1937, as SH 245. On July 15, 1935, the section of SH 77 west of Naples was cancelled. On September 26, 1939, SH 77 was extended west to Commerce, replacing SH 260, but this plan was cancelled on January 14, 1941. On February 28, 1966, SH 77 was extended west over FM 2880 from US 259 to US 67.

Junction list

References

077
Transportation in Morris County, Texas
Transportation in Cass County, Texas